First United Methodist Church is a church at 4901 Cobbs Drive in Waco, Texas.

Background

In 1850, the Rev. Joseph Perkins Sneed, founded the church where Jackson Street met the Brazos River. In 1858, the first church was built at Franklin Avenue and Third Street.

In 1962, ground was broken on a new church site (the current site) in Northwest Waco, and the current church was dedicated in March 1963.

In 2019, the church formally merged with downtown Waco's Austin Avenue United Methodist Church.

See also

National Register of Historic Places listings in McLennan County, Texas

References

United Methodist churches in Texas
20th-century Methodist church buildings in the United States
Churches completed in 1963
Buildings and structures in Waco, Texas